Moke is a traditional beverage from Flores Island, Indonesia, which is made from Borassus flabellifer and Arenga pinnata fruits. This beverage has many names including sopi, dewe, but it is widely known as Moke in Flores Island. Moke is considered as the symbol of friendship and hospitality for the people of Flores Island.

Moke in Flores Island
Moke is a traditional drink made from Borassus flabellifer and Arenga pinnata fruits fermentation, this beverage is made traditionally which technique is taught from generation to generation.  The making of this beverage is done in  people's yards using traditional cases made of clay for its cooking process. One bottle of moke can be made estimately 5 hours due to the process of waiting drop by drop of the fermentation using a bamboo tool. The best quality Moke is called by the florenese locals as Bakar Menyala or hot and flaming. The bakar menyala unlike the regular Moke that has an alcoholic effect, this beverage is good for  the health of the drinkers.

Varieties of Moke

White Moke
Moke is made by cooking Borassus flabellifer and Arenga pinnata fruits. The process of making it is by using a bamboo stick, wash it, and dry it up and put the fruits inside the bamboo then hang the bamboo and hit it several times, after that cut the tip of the bamboo. From the process, a white liquid will come out of the bamboo, this liquid is called white Moke. This white Moke has a sweet taste and can be cooked to be made as red sugar.

Black Moke
The black Moke is made of the fermentation of the white Moke. The fermentation is done in a case called kuwu tua. Black Moke is often served in traditional parties and ceremonies.

See also

 List of Indonesian beverages

References

Herbal and fungal stimulants
Indonesian alcoholic drinks